Abel López (born 25 March 1947) is a Cuban weightlifter. He competed at the 1968 Summer Olympics and the 1972 Summer Olympics.

References

1947 births
Living people
Cuban male weightlifters
Olympic weightlifters of Cuba
Weightlifters at the 1968 Summer Olympics
Weightlifters at the 1972 Summer Olympics
Sportspeople from Havana
Pan American Games medalists in weightlifting
Pan American Games gold medalists for Cuba
Pan American Games silver medalists for Cuba
Weightlifters at the 1971 Pan American Games
20th-century Cuban people
21st-century Cuban people